Birk is both a surname and a masculine given name. Notable people with the name include:

Surname
Ado Birk (1883–1942), Estonian former Prime Minister
Alma Birk (1917–1996), English journalist and politician
Anne Birk (1942–2009), German writer
Carsten Birk (born 1977), German footballer
Emmet Birk (1914–2000), American professional basketball player
Matt Birk (born 1976), American professional football player
Raye Birk (born 1943), American actor
Sandow Birk (born 1962), American artist
Thomas Birk (born 1988), German footballer
Yehudith Birk (1926–2013), Polish-born Israeli biochemist

Given name
Birk Anders (born 1964), German biathlete
Birk Engstrøm (born 1950), Norwegian footballer
Birk Risa (born 1998), Norwegian footballer
Birk Sproxton (1943–2007), Canadian poet and novelist

Fictional characters
Birk Balthazar, father of Sofia the First

See also
 Birke, given name and surname
 Burk (name)
 Birks (surname)

Masculine given names
Norwegian masculine given names